Working Title Films is a British film studio that produces motion pictures and television programs and is a subsidiary of Universal Pictures, a division of NBCUniversal, which is itself a division of Comcast. The company was founded by Tim Bevan and Sarah Radclyffe in 1983. It produces feature films and several television productions. Bevan and Eric Fellner are now the co-chairmen of the company.

Company
Working Title Films was co founded by producers Tim Bevan and Sarah Radclyffe in 1983. Radclyffe left in 1992, PolyGram became the company's corporate backer, and Eric Fellner, a fellow independent film producer, joined the company.

The company produced a variety of films for PolyGram's London based production company, PolyGram Filmed Entertainment. An Anglo-Dutch film studio, PolyGram Films became a major Hollywood competitor. In 1998, Seagram sold the bulk of its library of PolyGram films released up until 31 March 1996 to Metro-Goldwyn-Mayer.

In 1999, PolyGram was sold to the Seagram company and merged with MCA Music Entertainment, to form Universal Music Group. PolyGram Films was sold and folded into Universal Pictures in 1999. Although contractually allowed to produce any film with a budget of up to $35 million, on a practical basis, Bevan and Fellner consult with studio executives at Working Title's parent company NBCUniversal.

Working Title is headquartered in London, and has an office in Los Angeles, which is headed by producer Liza Chasin. More recently, the production company renewed its first look deal with Universal Pictures.

WT2 Productions
In 1999, Bevan and Fellner launched a subsidiary company named Working Title 2 Productions, commonly known as WT2. The company is an independent film production arm run by Natascha Wharton, and has produced films that include Billy Elliot, Shaun of the Dead and The Calcium Kid.

Television division
Working Title has been active in television production since the beginning of the 1990s. In February 2010, Working Title officially launched its television division as a joint venture with parent company NBCUniversal, itself owned by Comcast. Since then, they have produced content for both British and American television. Notable productions and co productions developed by Working Title Television (WTTV) include NBC's About a Boy, and Showtime's The Tudors.

WTTV has offices in London and Los Angeles.

TV productions

1991 ITV franchise bid
In 1991, Working Title was involved in a bid for the London Weekend ITV licence. Working Title, Mentorn, Palace and PolyGram wanted to take over from London Weekend Television and broadcast to London under the name London Independent Broadcasting. In the event LWT retained its licence; London Independent Broadcasting's proposals were deemed by the Independent Television Commission, which was overseeing the bid process, to fail the quality threshold.

Films

1980s

1990s

2000s

2010s

2020s

Upcoming

In development

References

External links

Profile of the founders on BBC News
Shaun of the Dead production company Working Title to launch TV division

 
Film production companies of the United Kingdom
Film production companies of the United States
Television production companies of the United Kingdom
Television production companies of the United States
Mass media companies established in 1983
British companies established in 1983
Universal Pictures subsidiaries
British subsidiaries of foreign companies
Mass media companies based in London
BAFTA Outstanding British Contribution to Cinema Award
1999 mergers and acquisitions